David Byrne (born 1952) is a Scottish musician and former Talking Heads frontman.

David Byrne may also refer to:

David Byrne (album), his eponymous album
David Byrne (Australian politician) (born 1952), member of the Queensland Legislative Assembly
David Byrne (barrister) (born 1947), Irish and European official
David Byrne (footballer, born 1905) (1905–1990), Irish footballer
David Byrne (footballer, born 1960) (born 1960), South African soccer player who played in North America
David Byrne (footballer, born 1961), English footballer
David Byrne (footballer, born 1979), Irish footballer
David Byrne (Gaelic footballer), Gaelic footballer for Dublin
David Byrne (Irish criminal), Irish criminal, shot dead in February 2016
David Byrne (playwright), British playwright and Artistic Director of the New Diorama Theatre

See also
David Burns (disambiguation)